Worsley is a habitational surname with several points of origin, particularly Lancashire and Worcestershire. Notable people with the name include:

 A. A. Worsley (1869–1927), American politician from Arizona
 Arthington Worsley (1861–1944), English botanist
 Arthur Worsley (1920–2001), English ventriloquist
 Beatrice Worsley (1921–1972), Canadian computer scientist
 Benjamin Worsley (1618–1673), English physician and surveyor-general of Ireland
 Charles Worsley (cricketer) (1902–1990), English cricketer
 Frank Worsley (1872–1943), New Zealand explorer
 Giles Worsley (1961–2006), British Architectural Historian
 Gump Worsley (1929–2007), Canadian hockey player
 Henry Worsley (disambiguation) several people
 Israel Worsley (1768–1836), English Unitarian minister
 Joe Worsley (born 1977), English rugby player
 Lieutenant General John Worsley (British Army officer) (1912–1987)
 John Worsley (artist) (1919–2000), British naval artist and illustrator
 Les Vandyke (1931–2021), English singer and songwriter, also known as John Worsley
 Rev. John Worsley (scholar) (1696–1767), English scholar and schoolmaster
 J. R. Worsley (1923–2003), English acupuncturist associated with 5 Element Style
 Katharine Worsley (born 1933), maiden name of the Duchess of Kent
 Lucy Worsley (born 1973), British historian and curator
 Sir Marcus Worsley, 5th Baronet (1925–2012), British politician, brother of the Duchess of Kent
 Maureen Worsley (1937–2001), Australian politician
 Mike Worsley (born 1976), English rugby player
 Miller Worsley (1791–1835), English naval officer
 Philip Stanhope Worsley (1835–1866), English poet
 Richard Worsley (1923–2013), English general
 Roger L. Worsley (born 1937), American academic
 T. C. Worsley (1907–1977), British critic
 William Worsley (priest) (c. 1435 – 1499), dean of St. Paul's Cathedral, London
 Sir William Worsley, 4th Baronet (1890–1973), baronet and cricketer, father of the Duchess of Kent
 Sir William Worsley, 6th Baronet (born 1956), baronet and forester, nephew of the Duchess of Kent
 Willie Worsley (born 1945), American professional basketball player

See also
 Lady Worsley (disambiguation)
 Worsley baronets
 Worsley (disambiguation)
 Worsley-Taylor baronets

References